Hentschel is a Germanic surname. People with this surname include:

 Carl Hentschel (1864-1930), British artist, phographer, printmaker, inventor and businessperson
 David Hentschel (born 1952), English recording engineer, writer and music producer
 Erwin Hentschel (1917–1944), German Knight's Cross recipient
 Falk Hentschel (born 1982), German actor
 Franziska Hentschel (born 1970), German field hockey player 
 Johannes Hentschel (1908–1982), German master electro-mechanic
 Klaus Hentschel (born 1961), German historian of science
 Trent Hentschel (born 1982), Australian rules footballer
 York Hentschel (born 1953), Canadian footballer 

Surnames of German origin